Local elections were held in Moldova on 5 June 2011, with a runoff for mayors two weeks later. In one of the most high-profile races, Dorin Chirtoacă was reelected as mayor of Chişinău in a very close run-off election.

Results

|-
!style="background-color:#E9E9E9" align=center colspan="2" valign=center|Parties and coalitions
!style="background-color:#E9E9E9" align=right|District and municipality councils
!style="background-color:#E9E9E9" align=right|%
!style="background-color:#E9E9E9" align=right|Places
!style="background-color:#E9E9E9" align=right|City and village councils
!style="background-color:#E9E9E9" align=right|%
!style="background-color:#E9E9E9" align=right|Places
!style="background-color:#E9E9E9" align=right|Mayors
!style="background-color:#E9E9E9" align=right|%
|-
|bgcolor="#0000C0"|
|align=left|Democratic Party of Moldova
|align="right"|
|align="right"|15,41%
|align="right"|226
|align="right"|
|align="right"|18,84%
|align="right"|2263
|align="right"|220
|align="right"|24,50%
|-
|bgcolor="#CC3333"|
|align=left|Party of Communists of the Republic of Moldova
|align="right"|
|align="right"|36,86%
|align="right"|434
|align="right"|
|align="right"|29,50%
|align="right"|3441
|align="right"|203
|align="right"|22,61%
|-
|bgcolor="#FFFFFF"|
|align=left|Socialist Party of Moldova
|align="right"|
|align="right"|0,01%
|align="right"|—
|align="right"|
|align="right"|0,00%
|align="right"|—
|align="right"|—
|align="right"|—
|-
|bgcolor="#FFFFFF"|
|align=left|Partidul Legii și Dreptății
|align="right"|
|align="right"|0,04%
|align="right"|—
|align="right"|
|align="right"|0,02%
|align="right"|2
|align="right"|—
|align="right"|—
|-
|bgcolor="#FF8000"|
|align=left|Christian-Democratic People's Party
|align="right"|
|align="right"|1,16%
|align="right"|5
|align="right"|
|align="right"|1,12%
|align="right"|75
|align="right"|6
|align="right"|0,67%
|-
|bgcolor="#00BFFF"|
|align=left|Liberal Party
|align="right"|
|align="right"|16,19%
|align="right"|130
|align="right"|
|align="right"|11,79%
|align="right"|1162
|align="right"|96
|align="right"|10,96%
|-
|bgcolor="#FFFFFF"|
|align=left|Partidul pentru Unirea Moldovei
|align="right"|
|align="right"|0,02%
|align="right"|—
|align="right"|
|align="right"|0,00%
|align="right"|—
|align="right"|—
|align="right"|—
|-
|bgcolor="#FF0000"|
|align=left|Social Democratic Party
|align="right"|
|align="right"|0,90%
|align="right"|6
|align="right"|
|align="right"|0,98%
|align="right"|58
|align="right"|2
|align="right"|0,22%
|-
|bgcolor="pink"|
|align=left|Party of Socialists of the Republic of Moldova
|align="right"|
|align="right"|0,09%
|align="right"|—
|align="right"|
|align="right"|0,17%
|align="right"|11
|align="right"|2
|align="right"|0,22%
|-
|bgcolor="#002FA7"|
|align=left|Republican Socio-Political Movement Equality
|align="right"|
|align="right"|0,22%
|align="right"|—
|align="right"|
|align="right"|0,15%
|align="right"|6
|align="right"|—
|align="right"|—
|-
|bgcolor="green"|
|align=left|Ecologist Party of Moldova "Green Alliance"
|align="right"|
|align="right"|0,26%
|align="right"|2
|align="right"|
|align="right"|0,37%
|align="right"|25
|align="right"|2
|align="right"|0,22%
|-
|bgcolor="#660066"|
|align=left|Republican Party of Moldova
|align="right"|
|align="right"|0,54%
|align="right"|5
|align="right"|
|align="right"|0,76%
|align="right"|60
|align="right"|4
|align="right"|0,45%
|-
|bgcolor="#FFFFFF"|
|align=left|Party of Labour
|align="right"|—
|align="right"|—
|align="right"|—
|align="right"|
|align="right"|0,06%
|align="right"|6
|align="right"|—
|align="right"|—
|-
|bgcolor="#FFFFFF"|
|align=left|Centrist Union of Moldova
|align="right"|
|align="right"|0,05%
|align="right"|—
|align="right"|
|align="right"|0,04%
|align="right"|3
|align="right"|—
|align="right"|—
|-
|bgcolor="#003399"|
|align=left|European Party
|align="right"|—
|align="right"|—
|align="right"|—
|align="right"|
|align="right"|0,03%
|align="right"|3
|align="right"|—
|align="right"|—
|-
|bgcolor="#FFEFD5"|
|align=left|Democratic People's Party of Moldova
|align="right"|
|align="right"|0,23%
|align="right"|—
|align="right"|
|align="right"|0,22%
|align="right"|5
|align="right"|—
|align="right"|—
|-
|bgcolor="#FFED00"|
|align=left|National Liberal Party
|align="right"|
|align="right"|0,64%
|align="right"|1
|align="right"|
|align="right"|0,65%
|align="right"|38
|align="right"|4
|align="right"|0,45%
|-
|bgcolor="#FFFFFF"|
|align=left|Partidul "Pentru Neam și Țară"
|align="right"|
|align="right"|0,21%
|align="right"|—
|align="right"|
|align="right"|0,30%
|align="right"|18
|align="right"|2
|align="right"|0,22%
|-
|bgcolor="#15803C"|
|align=left|Liberal Democratic Party of Moldova
|align="right"|
|align="right"|22,62%
|align="right"|300
|align="right"|
|align="right"|25,35%
|align="right"|3039
|align="right"|287
|align="right"|31,96%
|-
|bgcolor="#000000"|
|align=left|Partidul "Patrioții Moldovei"
|align="right"|
|align="right"|0,06%
|align="right"|—
|align="right"|
|align="right"|0,05%
|align="right"|2
|align="right"|—
|align="right"|—
|-
|bgcolor="#FFFFFF"|
|align=left|Partidul "Casa Noastră — Moldova"
|align="right"|
|align="right"|0,05%
|align="right"|—
|align="right"|
|align="right"|0,35%
|align="right"|38
|align="right"|—
|align="right"|—
|-
|bgcolor="#FFFFFF"|
|align=left|Blocul electoral "Forța a treia"
|align="right"|
|align="right"|0,38%
|align="right"|2
|align="right"|
|align="right"|0,62%
|align="right"|39
|align="right"|1
|align="right"|0,11%
|-
|bgcolor="#DDDDDD"|
|align=left|Independents
|align="right"|
|align="right"|4,06%
|align="right"|9
|align="right"|
|align="right"|8,62%
|align="right"|336
|align="right"|69
|align="right"|7,68%
|-
|align=left style="background-color:#E9E9E9" colspan="2"|Total (percent %)
|width="30" align="right" style="background-color:#E9E9E9"|
|width="30" align="right" style="background-color:#E9E9E9"|100,00%
|width="30" align="right" style="background-color:#E9E9E9"|1120
|width="30" align="right" style="background-color:#E9E9E9"|
|width="30" align="right" style="background-color:#E9E9E9"|100,00%
|width="30" align="right" style="background-color:#E9E9E9"|10630
|width="30" align="right" style="background-color:#E9E9E9"|898
|width="30" align="right" style="background-color:#E9E9E9"|100,00%
|-
|colspan="10" align=left |Source: e-democracy.md
|}

References

External links
 Local Elections of June 5, 2011 @ e-democracy.md

2011 in Moldova
Local elections in Moldova
2011 elections in Moldova